Susanne Bauckholt ( Meyer, born 24 September 1965 in Berlin) is a German sailor.

Together with Katrin Adlkofer she won the World Championship in the 470 in 1987 and 1989. They also and competed at 1988 and 1996 Olympics, finishing fifth each time.

References

External links
 
 
 

1965 births
Living people
Sportspeople from Berlin
German female sailors (sport)
Sailors at the 1988 Summer Olympics – 470
Sailors at the 1996 Summer Olympics – 470
Olympic sailors of Germany
World champions in sailing for Germany
470 class world champions